The River Tummel is a river in Perth and Kinross, Scotland. Water from the Tummel is used in the Tummel hydro-electric power scheme, operated by SSE.

As a tributary of the River Tay, the Tummel is included as part of the River Tay Special Area of Conservation. The designation notes the river system's importance for salmon, otters, brook lampreys, river lampreys and sea lampreys.

Description

Some 2 miles from its outlet from Loch Rannoch the river expands into Dunalastair Water (or Dunalastair Reservoir), a man made loch formed by a weir, part of the Tummel Hydro Electric power scheme.

The scenery throughout this reach is most picturesque, culminating at the point above the eastern extremity of the loch, known as the "Queen's View" (Queen Victoria made the view famous in 1866, although it is said to have been named after Queen Isabel, wife of Robert the Bruce).  The chief places of interest on the river are Kinloch Rannoch; Dunalastair, a rocky hill in well-wooded grounds, the embellishment of which was largely due to Alexander Robertson of Struan, the Jacobite and poet, from whom the spot takes its name (the stronghold of Alexander); Foss; Faskally House (beautifully situated on the left bank); Pitlochry; and Ballinluig.

The ancient name of the river, in its upper reaches at least, was the Dubhag.

Notes

References
 

Tay
1Tummel